Devina is a settlement immediately north of Slovenska Bistrica in northeastern Slovenia. The area is part of the traditional region of Styria. It is now included with the rest of the Municipality of Slovenska Bistrica in the Drava Statistical Region.

A small chapel in the village centre was built in 1947 in memory of four locals who died fighting in the Second World War.

References

External links
Devina at Geopedia

Populated places in the Municipality of Slovenska Bistrica